Norfolk was a County constituency of the House of Commons of the Parliament of England then of the Parliament of Great Britain from 1707 to 1800 and of the Parliament of the United Kingdom from 1801 to 1832. It was represented by two Members of Parliament. In 1832 the county was divided for parliamentary purposes into two new two member divisions – East Norfolk and West Norfolk.

History

Boundaries
The constituency consisted of the historic county of Norfolk in the East of England, excluding the city of Norwich which had the status of a county in its itself after 1404. (Although Norfolk contained four other parliamentary boroughs – Castle Rising, Great Yarmouth, King's Lynn and Thetford – each of which elected two MPs in its own right for part of the period when Norfolk was a constituency, these were not excluded from the county constituency: owning property within a borough could confer a vote at the county election. This was not the case, though, for Norwich.)

Franchise and electorate
As in other county constituencies the franchise between 1430 and 1832 was defined by the Forty Shilling Freeholder Act, which gave the right to vote to every man who possessed freehold property within the county valued at £2 or more per year for the purposes of land tax; it was not necessary for the freeholder to occupy his land, nor even in later years to be resident in the county at all.

Except during the period of the Commonwealth, Norfolk had two MPs elected by the bloc vote method, under which each voter had two votes. In the nominated Barebones Parliament of 1653, five members represented Norfolk. In the First and Second Parliaments of Oliver Cromwell's Protectorate, however, there was a general redistribution of seats and Norfolk elected ten members, while the two smallest of the county's boroughs (Castle Rising and Thetford) lost their seats. The traditional arrangements were restored from 1659.

At the time of the Great Reform Act in 1832, Norfolk had a population of approximately 390,000, though only a fraction of these could vote: the highest recorded turnouts in Norfolk were at the 1802 and 1806 elections, at each of which under 12,000 votes were cast, even though each voter could cast two votes.

Political character
Norfolk's electorate was predominantly rural, partly as an effect of the Norwich freeholders voting in the city rather than the county. It has been estimated from the pollbooks that in the early 19th century only around one in six of the voters lived in towns, with Great Yarmouth and King's Lynn contributing the largest numbers of these. Fittingly for such a constituency, the families of two of the best-known pioneers of the agrarian revolution, Coke of Holkham and "Turnip" Townshend, frequently provided the county's Members of Parliament.

Nevertheless, no one or two families controlled the constituency, and competition was fostered by the leading families lining up on different sides of the partisan divide. The leading Whig families around the turn of the 18th century were those of Walpole and Townshend, while the most important Tory interests were those of the Wodehouse and Astley families, until Sir Jacob Astley defected to the Whigs before the 1715 election. By the middle of the 18th century, the list of local peerage families who could expect to exert influence at Norfolk elections had grown to include the Hobart Earls of Buckinghamshire, the Earls Cholmondeley and the Lord Suffield, but these magnates remained divided, with contention between support for the "court" and "country" factions within the Whigs as well as between Whigs and Tories.

Consequently, the independent voters generally held the balance of power. But this did not prevent the various leading families from monopolising the representation between them, a process that accelerated in the 18th century: 16 different families represented Norfolk in the 22 Parliaments from 1660 to 1746, but only 7 in the 18 Parliaments from 1747 to 1832. The minor gentry could not expect to secure election for themselves, only to choose between the candidates of the major families. The Cokes of Holkham were generally regarded as the champions of the independent freeholders, and were frequently elected. Elections in Norfolk were therefore rarely a foregone conclusion, and often hard-fought at the canvassing stage even when the contest was not carried to a poll.

Elections were held at a single polling place, Norwich, and voters from the rest of the county had to travel to the county town to exercise their franchise. It was normal for voters to expect the candidates for whom they voted to meet their expenses in travelling to the poll, making the cost of a contested election substantial. Contested elections were therefore the exception rather than the rule, potential candidates preferring to canvass support beforehand and usually not insisting on a vote being taken unless they were confident of winning; at all but 8 of the 29 general elections between 1701 and 1832, Norfolk's two MPs were elected unopposed, with only two contests after 1768. But this was more frequent than in many other counties of Norfolk's size.

Members of Parliament

1290–1640

 Constituency created (1290)

1640–1832

Election results 1710–1832
Note on percentage change calculations: Where there was only one candidate of a party in successive elections, for the same number of seats, change is calculated on the party percentage vote. Where there was more than one candidate, in one or both successive elections for the same number of seats, then change is calculated on the individual percentage vote.

Note on sources: The information for the election results given below is taken from Sedgwick 1715–1754, Stooks Smith 1715–1754, Namier and Brooke 1754–1790 and Stooks Smith 1790–1832.

Elections in the 1710s

 Note (1710): Stooks Smith, whose compilation of results normally starts with the 1715 general election, is the source for this result. He gives no party classification for the candidates, but for three of them the position is obvious from the survey of Norfolk politics in The History of Parliament 1715–1754. Windham was probably a Whig, but this has not yet been confirmed.
 Note (1713): No source for the full result of this election has yet been located. Sir Jacob Astley was re-elected as a Tory but defected to the Whigs during the Parliament.

Elections in the 1720s

 Creation of Hobart as Lord Hobart and of Coke as Lord Lovel.

Elections in the 1730s

 Death of Wodehouse

Elections in the 1740s

Elections in the 1750s

Elections in the 1760s

 Succession of Townshend as the 4th Viscount Townshend

 Note (1768): Stooks Smith has different figures for Astley (2,977) and Coke (2,510).

Elections in the 1770s

 Death of Coke

Elections in the 1780s

Elections in the 1790s

Elections in the 1800s
 Creation of Wodehouse as 1st Baron Wodehouse

 Note (1802): Stooks Smith records that the polls were open for eight days

 Note (1806): Stooks Smith records that the polls were open for six days
 Election declared void

Elections in the 1810s

 Death of Astley

 Note (1817): Stooks Smith records that the polls were open for five days.

Elections in the 1820s

Elections in the 1830s

 Constituency divided following the Reform Act 1832, with effect from the 1832 United Kingdom general election.

See also

List of former United Kingdom Parliament constituencies

Notes and references

Notes

Bibliography
Robert Beatson, A Chronological Register of Both Houses of Parliament (London: Longman, Hurst, Res & Orme, 1807) 
D. Brunton & D. H. Pennington, Members of the Long Parliament (London: George Allen & Unwin, 1954)
 John Cannon, Parliamentary Reform 1640–1832 (Cambridge: Cambridge University Press, 1972)
Cobbett's Parliamentary history of England, from the Norman Conquest in 1066 to the year 1803 (London: Thomas Hansard, 1808) 
 Maija Jansson (ed.), Proceedings in Parliament, 1614 (House of Commons) (Philadelphia: American Philosophical Society, 1988) 
 Lewis Namier & John Brooke, The History of Parliament: The House of Commons 1754–1790 (London: HMSO, 1964)
 J. E. Neale, The Elizabethan House of Commons (London: Jonathan Cape, 1949)
 T. H. B. Oldfield, The Representative History of Great Britain and Ireland (London: Baldwin, Cradock & Joy, 1816)
 J Holladay Philbin, Parliamentary Representation 1832 – England and Wales (New Haven: Yale University Press, 1965)
 Romney Sedgwick, The House of Commons 1715–1754 (London: HMSO, 1970)
 M Stenton (ed.), Who's Who of British Members of Parliament: Volume I 1832–1885 (Harvester Press, 1976)
 M Stenton (ed.), Who's Who of British Members of Parliament, Volume II 1886–1918 (Harvester Press, 1978)
Henry Stooks Smith, The Parliaments of England from 1715 to 1847 (2nd edition, edited by FWS Craig – Chichester: Parliamentary Reference Publications, 1973)

Parliamentary constituencies in Norfolk (historic)
Constituencies of the Parliament of the United Kingdom established in 1290
Constituencies of the Parliament of the United Kingdom disestablished in 1832